Gabriella Colucci (born 1960s) is an Italian researcher who identifies plant based chemicals that can be used for industry. She won the EU Women innovators award in 2018.

Career
Colucci was born in Naples in the 1960s. She specialized in agricultural science.

In 1994 she went on an exchange to work for a year in Nigeria. After this she started research at the University of California, San Diego and at Arena Pharmaceuticals. After ten years she returned to Italy in 2004 where she started her own company.

In June 2018 she won the European Woman Innovator of the Year award in recognition of the 35 chemicals she had identified that have potential applications in cosmetics or agrochemicals. Her Italian company has been able to identify these chemicals by interpreting the messages that are sent between cells. She took the 100,000 euro prize. The second place went to Spaniard Alicia Asín Pére whose work relates to the Internet of Things and the third to Austrian Walburga Fröhlich. The young award went to Norwegian Karen Dolva who had devised a robot for socially inactive people. The prizes were awarded by European Commissioner Carlos Moedas and Eva Kaili MEP who chairs the European Parliament’s Science and Technology Options Assessment body.

References 

1960s births
Living people
Scientists from Naples
Italian agronomists